Aemilia may refer to:

People and places in classical history
 Aemilia (gens), patrician family of ancient Rome, and the female members of this gens
 Aemilia Tertia (c. 230–163 or 162 BC), third daughter of Lucius Aemilius Paullus, and wife of Scipio Africanus
 Aemilia Hilaria  (c. 300–c. 363), ancient Roman physician
 Aemilia Lepida, any of several female members of the gens Aemilia
 Emilia (region of Italy)
 Via Aemilia, a Roman road

Other uses
 Aemilia (moth)
 159 Aemilia, an asteroid
 Dutch ship Aemilia (1632), a Dutch ship of the line

See also 
 Emily (given name)
 Emilia (given name)

Feminine given names